Glade is a city in Phillips County, Kansas, United States.  As of the 2020 census, the population of the city was 52.

History
Glade was a shipping point on the Atchison & Lenora division of the Missouri Pacific railroad.

A post office was opened in Glade in 1908, and remained in operation until 1989. It was officially discontinued in 1996.

Geography
Glade is located at  (39.682582, -99.310965).

Demographics

2010 census
As of the census of 2010, there were 96 people, 39 households, and 24 families residing in the city. The racial makeup of the city was 99.0% White and 1.0% from two or more races. Hispanic or Latino of any race were 1.0% of the population.

There were 39 households, of which 30.8% had children under the age of 18 living with them, 51.3% were married couples living together, 5.1% had a female householder with no husband present, 5.1% had a male householder with no wife present, and 38.5% were non-families. 35.9% of all households were made up of individuals, and 12.9% had someone living alone who was 65 years of age or older. The average household size was 2.46 and the average family size was 3.13.

The median age in the city was 36.5 years. 31.2% of residents were under the age of 18; 8.4% were between the ages of 18 and 24; 16.6% were from 25 to 44; 30.3% were from 45 to 64; and 13.5% were 65 years of age or older. The gender makeup of the city was 47.9% male and 52.1% female.

2000 census
As of the census of 2000, there were 114 people, 44 households, and 31 families residing in the city. The racial makeup of the city was 98.25% White, and 1.75% from two or more races.

There were 44 households, out of which 38.6% had children under the age of 18 living with them, 63.6% were married couples living together, 4.5% had a female householder with no husband present, and 29.5% were non-families. 27.3% of all households were made up of individuals, and 11.4% had someone living alone who was 65 years of age or older. The average household size was 2.59 and the average family size was 3.13.

In the city, the population was spread out, with 28.1% under the age of 18, 5.3% from 18 to 24, 25.4% from 25 to 44, 26.3% from 45 to 64, and 14.9% who were 65 years of age or older. The median age was 40 years. For every 100 females, there were 115.1 males. For every 100 females age 18 and over, there were 100.0 males.

The median income for a household in the city was $35,625, and the median income for a family was $39,375. Males had a median income of $28,750 versus $18,750 for females. The per capita income for the city was $12,183. There were no families and 5.4% of the population living below the poverty line, including no under eighteens and 10.5% of those over 64.

See also
 Kirwin Reservoir

References

Further reading

External links
 Glade - Directory of Public Officials
 USD 325, local school district
 Glade city map, KDOT

Cities in Kansas
Cities in Phillips County, Kansas